Graeme McDonald Wilson (9 May 1919 – 2 September 1992) was a British academic and translator. He served in the Fleet Air Arm (1939–1946) and, following World War II, joined the Civil Service. He lectured for the British Council, wrote reviews for English literature journals, and wrote radio scripts for the Australian Broadcasting Company.  In 1964, he was seconded to the Foreign Service as counsellor and civil air attache at twelve Far Eastern posts. Between 1968 and 1969 he was a Ford Foundation Fellow of the National Translation Center in Austin, Texas. His works include co-translations, with Aiko Itō, of I Am a Cat and Ten Nights of Dreams by Natsume Sōseki.

Translations
 Girl in the Rain
 I Am a Cat, by Natsume Sōseki (with Aiko Itō), 1972
 Ten Nights of Dreams, Hearing Things by Natsume Sōseki (with Aiko Itō)
 The Heredity of Taste by Natsume Sōseki
 From the Morning of the World: Poems from the by Man'yōshū
 Three Contemporary Japanese Poets: Hitoshi Anzai, Kazuko Shiraishi, Shuntarō Tanikawa (with Atsumi Ikuko)
 Face at the Bottom of the World and Other Poems, translations of the modern Japanese poetry of Hagiwara Sakutaro
 Tree of Happiness

References 

1919 births
1992 deaths
Fleet Air Arm personnel of World War II
Ford Foundation fellowships
Japanese–English translators